The  is a railway route operated by the Japanese private railway  in Aomori Prefecture, from Chūō-Hirosaki Station in Hirosaki to Ōwani Station in Ōwani.

History
The company was founded by a combination of capital from the Hirosaki city government, and Mitsubishi Electric, with the line intended by Mitsubishi to be a test platform for future local train systems. On October 1, 1970, the Hirosaki Electric Railway was acquired by the Kōnan Railway Company, and its line became the Kōnan Railway Ōwani Line. At the same time all freight operations were suspended. A new Automatic Block Signal system became operational from November 1, 2003. Express services were suspended from November 2006.

Station list

Line Data
 Length: 
 Number of stations: 14 (including termini)
 Tracks: single track
 Block Signal: Automatic Block Signal

References
 Harris, Ken and Clarke, Jackie. Jane's World Railways 2008-2009. Jane's Information Group (2008).

External links
 official home page 

Railway lines in Japan
Rail transport in Aomori Prefecture
1067 mm gauge railways in Japan
Railway lines opened in 1952